Periboeum umbrosum is a species of beetle in the family Cerambycidae. It was described by Gounelle in 1909.

References

Elaphidiini
Beetles described in 1909